Nadir Mirza Afshar was the great-grandson of Nader Shah, the founder of the Afsharid dynasty of Persia. He was the fourth son of Shahrukh Afshar, emperor of Khorasan.

Biography 
In 1785, Shahrukh appointed Nadir Mirza as crown prince of Khorasan. This appointment displeased Nasrollah Mirza who was the older brother of Nadir Mirza. The two brothers had few armed clashes and when Nadir Mirza was defeated he fled to Tabas. Nasrollah Mirza died in Mashhad in 1787 and Nadir Mirza was restored as crown prince of Khorasan. In 1796 Shahrokh's Afsharid dynasty was conquered by Agha Muhammad Khan, the founder of the Qajar dynasty. Shahrokh was tortured and killed and the Qajar Shah appointed a Qajar Governor for Khorasan.

When Agha Muhammad Khan died in 1797 and Fath Ali Shah (his nephew) sat on the throne of Persia, Nadir Mirza Afshar was appointed as Governor of Khorasan. However Nadir Mirza was an ambitious man and wanted to regain independence so in 1802 he rebelled against the Qajar Shah from his capital, Mashhad.

His rebellion was a disaster as he was taken prisoner to Tehran, blinded and had his tongue cut off. He was killed on the orders of Fath Ali Shah in April 1803, along with his eldest sons Abbas Mirza, Ibrahim Mirza. His other three sons Tahmasp Mirza, Khaliq Vardi Mirza and Mahboub Ali Mirza were blinded by the orders of Fath Ali Shah. Another son, Ismail Mirza, fled to Hyderabad, Deccan. He settled there with help from Sir John Malcolm.

Notes 
Mohammad Qaneii, History of Torbat-e-Heydariyeh, pp. 103–104.

References 

Afsharid dynasty
18th-century births
1803 deaths
Year of birth unknown
18th-century Iranian politicians
19th-century Iranian politicians